Tom Saunders (1921 – 8 July 2001) was a notable figure in Bill Shankly’s Boot Room organisation at Liverpool FC, and served 30 years with the club.

Earlier years
Tom Saunders was born in Liverpool in 1921. He joined the Territorial Army as a 16-year-old and spent four years in North Africa.  He played amateur football for New Brighton, Burscough, Fleetwood, Marine and Prescot Cables.

He then took up a teaching post at Olive Mount Secondary School in Wavertree spending 17 years there before becoming head of the lower school at West Derby Comprehensive. He became interested in schoolboy football and managed Liverpool Schoolboys. He then went on to become the English schoolboy coach and held the position for ten years.

Liverpool
Saunders gained the necessary coaching certificates and after a spell running courses at Lilleshall he was, upon recommendation from Tony Waiters who was a youth coach at Liverpool, offered a job as Youth Development Officer at Anfield by Bill Shankly in 1968. It was the first appointment of its kind in British football. 

He oversaw the development of more or less every player from 1970 to 1986, including such as David Fairclough, Jimmy Case and Steve Heighway. He also spied for Liverpool in Europe, making dossiers on unknown opponents from across the region. He was also appointed Liverpool's Chief Scout.

He also brought Frank Skelly into the Liverpool set up. Skelly began scouting for the Reds at the request of Tom Saunders in 1973 when Bill Shankly was manager. He spotted  Bruce Grobbelaar who played for Crewe Alexandra while on loan from Vancouver Whitecaps.

Tom Saunders finally retired from his position as Youth Development Officer in 1986. He returned to Anfield after being elected to the board of directors in 1993. Although his principal task was in administration, he helped the likes of Graeme Souness and Twentyman's fellow bootroom coach Roy Evans through their work as managers. Saunders recommended Phil Thompson to Gérard Houllier for appointment as Assistant Manager at Liverpool. 

He died on 8 July 2001 after a long illness.

References

1921 births
2001 deaths
Liverpool F.C. non-playing staff
New Brighton A.F.C. players
Footballers from Liverpool
Association footballers not categorized by position
English footballers
Prescot Cables F.C. players
Burscough F.C. players
Marine F.C. players
Fleetwood Town F.C. players